Caroline Paola Oliveira da Silva (born April 14, 1982), best known as Paolla Oliveira, is a Brazilian actress.

Biography 
Paolla Oliveira was born in São Paulo. Her father is a retired military policeman while her mother is a housewife. Paolla Oliveira started working as a model when she was 16 years old, but she eventually became an actress after finishing studying performing arts at the same time she graduated in physiotherapy at Cruzeiro do Sul University. She is of Portuguese, Italian and Spanish descent.

Career 
After starring several television ads, she participated in the TV Record telenovela Metamorphoses in 2004, and in the following year she joined the cast of TV Globo telenovela Belíssima, where she played the role of "Giovana". Due to her popularity in Belíssima, in 2005 she was invited by O Profeta's production staff to play the telenovela's lead role of Sônia. In 2007, she played the role of Renata in TV Globo's end of the year special Os Amadores, and in March 2008, she was hired to play the role of tennis player Letícia in Ciranda de Pedra, which is a telenovela set in the 1950s. Her character's inspiration is Brazilian tennis player Maria Esther Bueno. Paolla Oliveira starred in the feature film Entre Lençóis. Filming began in May 2008. The movie was released on December 5, 2008. On June 28, 2009, Paolla Oliveira won the sixth edition of Dança dos Famosos (Brazilian Dancing with the Stars). Her partner was Átila Amaral.

She played the lead role of Marina in Insensato Coração in 2011. Paolla Oliveira starred as Paloma in the 2013 Rede Globo telenovela Amor à Vida. She played the villain Melissa in the 2015 telenovela Além do Tempo. Paolla Oliveira plays the protagonist Jeiza, who is a police officer and the romantic interest of Marco Pigossi in the 2017 telenovela A Força do Querer.

Filmography

Television

Film

Awards and nominations

Melhores do Ano

Prêmio Contigo! de TV

Quality Award Brazil

Super Gold Cap Trophy

Paulista Association of Art Critics

Prêmio Extra de Televisão

Internet Trophy

References

External links 
 

1982 births
Living people
Actresses from São Paulo
Brazilian people of Portuguese descent
Brazilian people of Italian descent
Brazilian people of Spanish descent
Brazilian film actresses
Brazilian telenovela actresses
Dancing with the Stars winners
21st-century Brazilian actresses